Naivo (born Naivoharison Patrick Ramanmonjisoa) is a Malagasy writer of historical fiction and the author of the first Malagasy novel to be translated into English, Beyond the Rice Fields.

Early life 
Naivo worked as a teacher in Paris. He emigrated to Canada where he works as a journalist and lives in Ottawa.

Career 
His debut adult fiction novel was Beyond the Rice Fields. The novel draws inspiration from Malagasy history. It was first published in French by Éditions Sépia in 2016. It is the first work of fiction from Madagascar to be translated into English. The translation was made possible through a 2015 PEN/Heim Translation Fund Grant. Beyond the Rice Fields was longlisted for the 2018 BTBA for Fiction and Poetry. It received a Five-Heart Review from Foreword Reviews.

His short story collection Madagascar entre poivre et vanille: Petits portraits à plume débridée, deals with Madagascar's coups, the corrupt judiciary system, monarchy and colonialism.

Bibliography 
Novels

 Beyond the Rice Fields (Restless Books, 2017)

Short stories

 Madagascar entre poivre et vanille: Petits portraits à plume débridée (2016)

Non-Fiction

 Les mutations culturelles à Madagascar vues à travers le prisme du hainteny, "poésie" traditionnelle (2018)

Awards 
Nominations

2018

BTBA for Fiction and Poetry Longlist for Beyond the Rice Fields (Restless Books, 2017)

Won

1996

 RFI/ACCT Prize for short story "Dahalo"

References 

Living people
Historical novelists
Malagasy male writers
Malagasy novelists
Malagasy journalists
Year of birth missing (living people)
21st-century novelists
21st-century journalists
21st-century male writers
Male novelists
Male journalists